Pali (पाली) Lok Sabha constituency is in Pali district, in the Indian state of Rajasthan.

Assembly segments
After the delimitation, presently this constituency comprises the following eight Vidhan Sabha segments:

Before the delimitation of the parliamentary constituencies in 2008, this Lok Sabha constituency comprised the following eight Vidhan Sabha (legislative assembly) segments:
 Bali, Desuri (SC), Jaitaran, Kharchi,
 Pali, Raipur, Sojat, Sumerpur

Members of Parliament

Election results

2019 Lok Sabha

2014 Lok Sabha

2009 Lok Sabha

2004 Lok Sabha

See also
 Pali district
 List of Constituencies of the Lok Sabha

References

Pali district
Lok Sabha constituencies in Rajasthan